Perthes is the name of three communes in France:

 Perthes, Ardennes, in the Ardennes département
 Perthes, Haute-Marne, in the Haute-Marne département
 Perthes, Seine-et-Marne, in the Seine-et-Marne département

As a German surname:
 Friedrich Christoph Perthes (1772–1843); publisher
 Georg Perthes (1869–1927); surgeon
 Justus Perthes (1749–1816); publisher, uncle of Friedrich Christoph Perthes

It may also refer to:
 Perthes-lès-Brienne, in the Aube département
 Perthes test, clinical test, done in surgery

See also
 Legg–Calvé–Perthes disease